Kyzyrbak (Qıźırbaq) is a rural locality (a village) in Salavatsky Selsoviet, Salavatsky District, Bashkortostan, Russia. The population was 11 as of 2010. There are 2 streets.

Geography 
Kyzyrbak is located 14 km northeast of Maloyaz (the district's administrative centre) by road. Kalmaklarovo is the nearest rural locality.

References 

Rural localities in Salavatsky District